No Te Olvides de la Banda (Don't Forget About the Band) (2002) is the nineteenth studio album by Mexican rock and blues band El Tri.

Reception 

The Allmusic review by Drago Bonacich awarded the album 3 stars stating "In an attempt to captivate its fans' attention, the rock en Español outfit previously known as Three Souls in My Mind delivered an album closer to its original style, featuring lyrics mostly based on controversial social issues."

Track listing 
All tracks by Alex Lora

 "Chilangolandia" (slang term for Mexico City) – 8:12
 "Volvimos a Perder" (We Lost Again) – 5:02
 "Solamente Dios" (Only God) – 5:06
 "No Te Olvides de la Banda" (Don't Forget About the Band) – 4:31
 "El Amor Neto" (True Love) – 4:06
 "Los Espermatozoides" (The Sperms) – 3:13
 "El Calzón" (The Briefs) – 3:42
 "Tu Sonrisa" (Your Smile) – 4:44
 "A Partir de Hoy" (As of Today) – 5:40
 "Lo Demás Me Vale" (The Hell With The Rest) – 3:46
 "De la Raza Pa' la Banda" (From The People To The Band) – 10:19

Personnel 

 Alex Lora – guitar, bass, vocals, producer, mixing
 Rafael Salgado – harmonic
 Eduardo Chico – guitar
 Oscar Zarate – guitar, mixing
 Chela Lora – backing vocals, art direction
 Ramon Perez – drums
 Lalo Toral – keyboards

Technical personnel 

Gene Grimaldi – mastering
Charles Johnson – mixing
Richard Kaplan – engineer, mixing
Kevin Meeker – assistant, assistant engineer
Pablo Munguia – mixing, recording coordinator

References

External links 
www.eltri.com.mx
No Te Olvides de la Banda at MusicBrainz
[ No Te Olvides de la Banda] at Allmusic

El Tri albums
2002 albums
Warner Music Group albums